Glenea speciosa is a species of beetle in the family Cerambycidae. It was described by Charles Joseph Gahan in 1889.

References

speciosa
Beetles described in 1889